John Wolters may refer to:

 John Wolters (musician), drummer with Dr. Hook & the Medicine Show
 John Wolters (canoeist) (born 1940), American sprint canoeist